Arthur Hill, 2nd Marquess of Downshire PC, FRS (3 March 1753 – 7 September 1801), styled Viscount Fairford until 1789 and Earl of Hillsborough from 1789 to 1793, was a British peer and MP.

Life
Hill was the eldest son of Wills Hill, 1st Earl of Hillsborough (later Marquess of Downshire). He matriculated at Magdalen College, Oxford in 1771, and received his M.A. in 1773.

Hill sat as a Tory for the rotten borough of Lostwithiel from 1774 to 1780, and then for Malmesbury until 1784. He also represented Down in the Parliament of Ireland from 1776 until succeeding to the peerage in 1793.

Hill enjoyed a number of civil and military appointments in both England and Ireland during this period. He was commissioned a captain in the Hertfordshire Militia on 22 March 1775, and a lieutenant-colonel in the regiment on 4 May 1787, resigning his commission on 4 June 1794. Appointed the deputy governor of County Down on 6 August 1779, he was picked as High Sheriff of the county in 1785. Hillsborough, as he then was, was chosen a Fellow of the Royal Society on 22 January 1790 and a deputy lieutenant of Berkshire on 12 May 1792.

Upon the death of his father on 7 October 1793, he succeeded him as Marquess of Downshire, in the Peerage of Ireland, as well as in his other subsidiary titles, including that of Earl of Hillsborough in the Peerage of Great Britain. He also succeeded his father as Hereditary Constable of Hillsborough Fort, and as Custos Rotulorum of County Down (16 October) and Governor of Down (17 October). On 7 November, he was appointed to the Privy Council of Ireland.

Downshire vigorously exerted himself against the Union of Great Britain and Ireland in 1800, and was punished by the Government for his opposition by being dismissed from the Governorship of Down and the colonelcy of the Downshire Militia, and struck off the roll of the Privy Council, on 12 February 1800.

Family
On 29 June 1786, he married Mary Sandys, by whom he had seven children: 
Arthur Blundell Sandys Trumbull Hill, 3rd Marquess of Downshire (1788–1845)
Lt.-Gen. Arthur Moyses William Hill, 2nd Baron Sandys (1792–1860)
Lady Charlotte Hill (15 July 1794 – 30 September 1821)
Lady Mary Hill (8 July 1796 – 24 May 1830)
Arthur Marcus Cecil Sandys, 3rd Baron Sandys (1798–1863)
Lord Arthur Augustus Edwin Hill (13 Aug 1800 – 10 July 1831)
Major Lord George Augusta Hill (9 December 1801 – 6 April 1879)

His last son, Lord George Hill, was born posthumously, as Downshire died by suicide on 7 September 1801. His widow, Mary, felt his early death was in part due to his humiliation by the Government, and thereafter was a bitter enemy to Robert Stewart, Viscount Castlereagh. She was the heiress of her uncle, Edwin Sandys, 2nd Baron Sandys, and to the estates of her grandfather, William Trumbull, including Easthampstead Park. In 1802, after Downshire's death, she was created Baroness Sandys, with a special remainder to her younger sons and their heirs male in succession and then to her eldest son and his heirs male.

Hill also had a son, William Arthur Dore-Hill, born in 1778, with his mistress Sarah Dore (who later married William Garrow).

References

1753 births
1801 deaths
People from Hillsborough, County Down
People from Bracknell
Alumni of Magdalen College, Oxford
Fairford, Arthur Hill, Viscount
Fairford, Arthur Hill, Viscount
Deputy Lieutenants of Berkshire
Fellows of the Royal Society
Kilwarlin, Arthur Hill, Viscount
Hillsborough, Arthur Hill, Earl of
Hillsborough, Arthur Hill, Earl of
Fairford, Arthur Hill, Viscount
Members of the Privy Council of Ireland
Fairford, Arthur Hill, Viscount
British Militia officers
High Sheriffs of Down
Arthur
Arthur 2
Members of the Parliament of Ireland (pre-1801) for County Down constituencies